Buddhism in Venezuela is practiced by very approximately 52,000 people (roughly 0.2% of the population) as of 2015. The Buddhist community is made up mainly of Chinese, Japanese, and Koreans.

Most identify with the Mahayana tradition, reflecting the religious heritage of their emigrant countries.

However, in the mid-1990s Keun-Tshen Goba (né Ezequiel Hernandez Urdaneta), together with Jigme Rinzen, founded a meditation center using the Shambhala Training method.
There are Buddhist centers in Caracas, Maracay, Mérida, Puerto Ordáz, San Felipe, and Valencia.

See also
 Buddhism in Brazil
 Buddhism in Argentina
 Buddhism in Costa Rica
 Buddhism in Nicaragua
 Buddhism in Mexico
 Buddhism in Canada
 Buddhism in the United States
 Buddhism in Central America
 Buddhism by country

References

External links
Buddhist centers of Venezuela

 
Religion in Venezuela
Venezuela